Alaska has about 67 named artificial reservoirs, approximately 167 named dams,and about 3,197 officially named natural lakes, out of over 3,000,000 unnamed natural lakes.
For named natural lakes, see the list of lakes of Alaska.

List

Notes

See also 
List of islands of Alaska
List of rivers of Alaska
List of lakes of Alaska
List of waterfalls of Alaska

References

General references

External links 

Dams and reservoirs

Alaska
Alaska
Dams and reservoirs